David Y. H. Lui (CM)  (September 28, 1944 – September 15, 2011) was a prominent Canadian arts impresario and producer, highly respected for constructing the arts infrastructure in Vancouver.

Biography
Of Chinese heritage, Lui was born in Vancouver, British Columbia, and attended Kitsilano Secondary School and the University of British Columbia. Lui was an important cornerstone at the forefront of Vancouver's cultural scene. A crucial member of the city's art community for more than 40 years, he helped found the Ballet of British Columbia.

Boards and memberships
Organisations connected with Lui include:
 Ballet British Columbia
 Cultural Program Developer and Member at the Canadian International Dragon Boat Festival
 Dance Foundation – Developer of the Scotiabank Dance Centre
 Canada Council for the Arts 
 British Columbia Arts Council

Personal life
Lui died in Vancouver from complications of congenital heart failure. He was survived by his brother, Philip, and his sister-in-law Ping.

Awards
 Member of the Order of Canada for service in the arts
 Recipient of gold and silver Queen Elizabeth Jubilee medal (1992)

Footnotes

1944 births
2011 deaths
Artists from Vancouver
Canadian people of Chinese descent
Members of the Order of Canada
University of British Columbia alumni